The Constitution of the Cisalpine Republic, was the second constitution of the Cisalpine Republic, a sister republic of France, roughly comprising the modern-day northern regions of Lombardy and Emilia-Romagna. It came into effect just after a French golpe on 31 August 1798, replacing the 1797 Constitution.

Napoleon had gone to Egypt, so the new French general Guillaume Brune managed to impose his friends to the Milanese administration.

The local French ambassador appointed a new government, and a new Parliament reduced to 40 and 80 members for each house. Even the departments were enlarged and reduced for 20 to 11.

Even this constitution lasted a single year, when the war restarted and Austria conquered Milan restoring the monarchy.

See also
Statuto Albertino
Constitution of Italy
Constitution of Italy (1802)
Constitution of the Cisalpine Republic (1797)
Constitutional Statute of Italy

External links
 Text of the Constitution 

Law of Italy
Cisalpine Republic
1798 in law
1798 in Europe